Sidney Clarke Phillips, Jr. (September 2, 1924 – September 26, 2015) was a United States Marine, family practice physician, and author from Mobile, Alabama. He provided source material and interviews for the making of Ken Burns' PBS documentary film The War and the HBO miniseries The Pacific. His recollections revolve around his time as a young man fighting in the Pacific War.

Biography

Early life
Phillips was born in Mobile, Alabama, the second child after his sister Katharine (1923-2019). A younger brother, John, followed. Their father, Sidney (1893-1950), was a US Army veteran of the Battle of Argonne Forest who became a teacher, then the principal of Murphy High School, where Phillips graduated in 1941. He was childhood friends with Eugene Sledge.

Military service
After graduating from high school, Phillips enlisted in the U.S. Marine Corps at age 17, on December 8, 1941; the day after the Attack on Pearl Harbor. He was inducted later that month after obtaining parental permission.

He served with How Company, 2nd Battalion, 1st Marine Regiment, 1st Marine Division and saw combat as an 81mm mortarman in a number of battles including the Battle of the Tenaru during the Guadalcanal Campaign and the Battle of Cape Gloucester. He reported that his mortar crew observed effective fire control discipline; one example was a firefight on Cape Gloucester where they were able to provide light high explosive rounds through the jungle canopy only 15 yards in front of their own lines.

Post-war
After his overseas duty he enrolled in V12, a program designed to educate young men so they could become U.S. Navy officers. However, his four-year US Marine Corps enlistment expired on December 31, 1945, freeing him to return to Mobile.

He had decided while at Cape Gloucester to become a physician, so he enrolled in Spring Hill College, then went to medical school to become a family physician. He enlisted in the USMC Reserves while at Spring Hill, then was finally discharged in April 1948.

Phillips reported that Eugene Sledge's widow and sons introduced him to Ken Burns' writing team, then later the HBO writers, so that he was able to provide needed information about the lives of Marines in combat for the making of The Pacific.

In April 1946, he married Mary Houston and his best man was Eugene Sledge. He and Mary had three children together and they remained married until her death in 2000.

Death
Phillips died on September 26, 2015. He is buried at Pine Crest Cemetery in Mobile.

In media 
Phillips wrote the memoir You'll be Sor-ree, an accounting of his experiences in the Marines. As a surviving veteran of World War II battles including the Guadalcanal Campaign and the Battle of Cape Gloucester, he provided valuable documentary interviews describing his recollections of the Pacific Theater of Operations. His character was played by actor Ashton Holmes in the HBO miniseries The Pacific.

See also

John Basilone
 Robert Leckie
 Eugene Sledge

References

External links

1924 births
2015 deaths
American memoirists
United States Marine Corps personnel of World War II
American primary care physicians
Military personnel from Mobile, Alabama
United States Marines
Writers from Mobile, Alabama
Spring Hill College alumni
Family physicians